Osc-Dis or Oscillator in Distortion is the eighth album by Japanese band The Mad Capsule Markets. It was released in Japan in 1999 and released outside Japan in 2001. Osc-Dis was the band's breakthrough album and finally got them recognized overseas, with the single "Pulse". The album mixes industrial metal, industrial rock and punk rock with various kinds of electronic music. It was more melodic than their previous album and included elements of pop punk. There are vocal contributions from Hirosuke from Balzac, Yamada from Geronimo, and Katsya from NND. This album also saw the birth of the band's mascots The White Crusher and The Cyborn.

The song "Pulse" appears on the in-game soundtrack to Tony Hawk's Pro Skater 3 and in Jonny Moseley Mad Trix.

Track listing

Other versions include a digipak with a bonus DVD including videos for "Tribe", "Pulse", "All the Time in Sunny Beach", "Good Girl", "MIDI Surf", and "Systematic"

References

The Mad Capsule Markets albums
1999 albums
2001 albums